SVAR may refer to:

Vector autoregression#Structural vs. reduced form
National Archives of Sweden